Sebastian Castro may refer to:

Sebastian Castro (painter), 17th-century Flemish marine artist 
Sebastian Castro-Tello, Swedish footballer
Seb Castro, American actor and singer